'Inéquilibre' (literally meaning "imbalance", from the French "équilibre" which means "balance") is a bronze sculpture by French artist Val. Out of the twelve editions, only one is currently placed publicly within SkySuite, the highest residential tower in Singapore.

Description 
This sculpture was inspired by the ruined temples under restoration at Angkor Wat in Cambodia. Each stone is removed, numbered, and each temple is reconstructed, embellished by the marks of time. The man moves alongside, serene and as a witness of his own time. The sculpture questions the place of mankind, the search for harmony within the imbalance (inéquilibre) that is offered to us.

References

Bronze sculptures in Singapore